Monivea-Abbey is a Gaelic Athletic Association club based in Monivea, County Galway, Ireland. The club is a member of the Galway GAA. Monivea-Abbey cater for  Gaelic football.

Notable players

 Cillian McDaid

History

Honours
Galway Senior Club Football Championship: 1
1992
 Galway Intermediate Club Football Championship 
2016

Famous players
Tomas Mannion 1998 and 2001 All-Ireland winner with Galway
Mattie Coleman won an All-Ireland Minor Medal in 1976 and went on to play for Galway winning a National League Medal in 1981. He was No. 4 on the Galway side defeated by Dublin in the 1983 All-Ireland Football Final.

Gaelic football clubs in County Galway
Gaelic games clubs in County Galway